Royal Palm may refer to:
Royal palm or Roystonea, a genus of palm trees
Royal Palm (train), a passenger train of the Southern Railway
Royal Palm (turkey), a breed of domestic turkey

See also 
 Royal Palm Golf and Country Club, Lahore, Punjab, Pakistan
Royal Palms Resort and Spa, Phoenix, Arizona
 Royal Palm Hotel (disambiguation)